Lucas Lucheri Indeche (born 12 February 1991) is a Kenyan international footballer who plays for A.F.C. Leopards as a goalkeeper.

Career
Born in Thika, Indeche has played club football for Thika United, SoNy Sugar and A.F.C. Leopards.

He made his international debut for Kenya in 2012.

References

1991 births
Living people
Kenyan footballers
Kenya international footballers
Thika United F.C. players
SoNy Sugar F.C. players
A.F.C. Leopards players
Kenyan Premier League players
Association football goalkeepers
People from Kiambu County